The Jino (also spelled Jinuo) people are a Tibeto-Burman ethnic group. They form one of the 56 ethnic groups officially recognized by the People's Republic of China. They live in an area called the Jino Mountains (Jinuoshan 基诺山) in eastern Jinghong, Xishuangbanna, Yunnan province.

The Jino are one of the less numerous of the recognized minorities in China and the last one included as "national minority" because they were only recognized in 1979. A former name used for the Jino, Youle, means "following the maternal uncle," an indication of a matrilineal past.

The Jino have a population of 20,900 people according to the census of the year 2000. 
Most of the Jino concentrate in Jinoshan, in a series of mild hills with wet climate near Mengyang Township in Jinghong Municipality, Xishuangbanna Dai Autonomous Prefecture of Yunnan Province. They live in an area of about 70x50 km. They live in subtropical rainforest, home of elephants, wild oxen and monkeys.

Among their cultural practices is tooth painting, in which soot made from pear trees is used.

Population distribution
This table shows the population distribution of the Jino nationality on the county level, according to the figures of the last census of 2000. (Showing only values above 0.10%.)

References

External links 
 The Jino ethnic minority (Chinese government website)

Ethnic groups in Yunnan
Ethnic groups officially recognized by China